Sunday Emmanuel or Emmanuel Sunday may refer to:

 Emmanuel Sunday (artist) (1955–), a Nigerian artist also known as Lemi Ghariokwu
 Sunday Emmanuel (athlete) (1978–2004), a Nigerian athlete and sprinter
 Sunday Emmanuel (footballer) (1992–), a Nigerian footballer